Amy Sène (born 6 April 1986) is a French-born Senegalese track and field athlete who competes in the hammer throw. She is the African record holder with her personal best of 69.70 metres. Sène is a three-time winner at the African Championships and was the gold medallist at the 2011 All-Africa Games and silver medallist at the 2015 All-Africa Games. She also competed at the 2012 Summer Olympics and the 2016 Summer Olympics.

Born in Lorient to Senegalese parents, she opted to represent Senegal internationally from 2010 onwards. Training with the Stade Rennais Athletisme club, she was the 2005 French junior champion and competed for her country of birth at the 2007 European Athletics U23 Championships. She cleared sixty metres for the first time that year, setting a personal best of 62.00 m in June. She improved to 63.44 m in 2009 and won the French universities championship in Nice in 2010.

Following her transfer to Senegal at the end of 2009, she went on to break the Senegalese record five times in 2010, culminating in a personal best of 64.11 m to win the gold medal at the 2010 African Championships in Athletics. She brought an end to Marwa Hussein's eight-year dominance of the event. She bettered her own record four more times in 2011, with a throw of 68.45 m in Tomblaine being her season's best. She gained selection for the 2011 World Championships in Athletics and threw 66.15 m in the qualifiers in what was Senegal's first hammer throw appearance at the competition. She ended her year with a gold medal at the 2011 All-Africa Games.

Sène broke the African record at the 2012 French Athletics Championships with her clearance of 69.10 m for third place. Following her continental record, she retained her hammer title at the 2012 African Championships in Athletics.

After she lost her African double title (African Championships at Marrakech 2014 and All Africa Games 2015), she came back and won the gold medal at 2016 African Championships in Athletics Durban 2016. She broke the African championships record of Marhwa Hussein with 68.35 m.

Competition record

References

External links
 
 
 
 
 

Living people
1986 births
Sportspeople from Lorient
Senegalese hammer throwers
French female hammer throwers
Senegalese female athletes
Olympic athletes of Senegal
Athletes (track and field) at the 2012 Summer Olympics
Athletes (track and field) at the 2016 Summer Olympics
Athletes (track and field) at the 2015 African Games
World Athletics Championships athletes for Senegal
French sportspeople of Senegalese descent
African Games gold medalists for Senegal
African Games medalists in athletics (track and field)